Castello Brown is a historic house museum located high above the harbour of Portofino, Italy. Its site has been used for military defence since Roman times. As a Genoese coastal fort, it was called the Castello di San Giorgio. After peace fell upon the region in the early 19th century, the Castello was abandoned. Some decades later, it was purchased by the English consul, who remodelled it as a comfortable villa. His descendants held the property until 1949, then sold it to an English couple who restored several ruined sections, and in turn sold it in 1961 to the City of Portofino, which now opens it to the public. 

Elizabeth von Arnim wrote and set her novel The Enchanted April at the Castello in 1922. The award-winning 1991 movie adaptation featuring Miranda Richardson and Joan Plowright was filmed on site.

Military history

The castle's site is well suited for harbour defence, and appears to have been so used since Roman times. Fortifications from the fourth century AD have been found underneath the modern castle; a castrum and a turris are recorded.

The castle continued to function as a military fortress until about 1600, then became increasingly residential. Richard the Lionheart stayed for several days on his way to the Third Crusade. 

As Portofino was an important harbour, the Castello featured in many naval battles between the 13th and 19th centuries, withstanding attacks by the Genoese (Ghibelline) admiral Aitone D'Oria in 1330, by a Venetian fleet in 1431, and by the British Navy in 1814.  The castello was one of two key coastal fortresses of the Republic of Genoa. Along with Ventimiglia, it housed a garrison led by a patrician castellano.

In 1442, it housed two bombards that fired stone cannon-balls. According to the Record Office of Genoa, cannon batteries were constructed on the site in the early 16th century, and military engineer  drew up plans for a full fortress circa 1554. In 1575 the Castello was instrumental in turning back an attack on the town by Giò Andrea Doria. The structure was enlarged from 1622 to 1624, and survived in this form for a century and a half.  By 1697, the armaments included two half-cannon and 14 other guns, and the Castello's inventory included 50 muskets and various arquebus, halberds and spears. 

The Republic of Genoa fell in 1797. In the next year, the Castello's little tower was destroyed in an English attack on Napoleon's Ligurian Republic. Napoleon garrisoned the Castello and increased its armament to protect coastal traffic against the British fleet, which unsuccessfully attacked it again in March 1814.

The castle was abandoned after the Congress of Vienna in 1815. The fortress was formally disarmed in 1867, just before it was sold to the Yeats-Brown family. During the German occupation of Italy, the castello was used as a prison for partisans.

Residential history

In 1867, the structure was purchased for 7,000 lire by Montague Yeats-Brown, then English consul in Genoa. He engaged the architect , and with advice from his artist friend and fellow-consul James Harris the fort was transformed to a comfortable villa without substantial alteration in its general form. Brown bought many church reliefs during the general selling-up of churches in the 1880s and made them a feature of the villa's interior and terraces. 

Jocelyn and Lieutenant-Colonel John Baber CBE purchased Castello Brown in 1949, and sold it to the municipality in 1961. Throughout this time, the property was managed by several generations of the Garbarino family.

References

Further reading
 Castello Brown: Brief historical notes, undated brochure from the castello

External links
The official website 

Villas in Liguria
Castles in Liguria